Yoogali is a small town in the local government area of the City of Griffith in the Australian state of New South Wales. It is situated between Griffith and Yenda, just outside the Mooreville industrial estate.

History
Yoogali Post Office opened on 17 March 1924 and closed in 1991.

Today
It currently houses a club, beautician & hairdresser salon, a specialty hairdresser salon, a cafe, 2 car dealerships, a vet, 2 plant nurseries, a public school, a private school and a special needs school.

Heritage listings
Yoogali has a number of heritage-listed sites, including:
 Edon Street: Our Lady of Pompeii Roman Catholic Church

References

External links

Towns in New South Wales